The Fix may refer to:

Music 
 The Fix (album), a 2002 release by rap artist Scarface
 The Fix (band), a hardcore band from Lansing, Michigan
 The Fix, a 2005 EP by Jordan Knight
 The Fix (musical), a 1997 musical by John Dempsey and Dana P. Rowe
 "The Fix" (song), a 2015 single by Nelly
 "The Fix", song by Elbow from The Seldom Seen Kid
 The Fix (opera), a 2019 opera about the Chicago Black Sox Scandal.

Publications 
 The Fix (blog), an American political weblog on The Washington Post website
 The Fix (book), a 2012 book about addiction by British writer and Daily Telegraph columnist Damian Thompson

Film and television 
 The Art of the Steal (2013 film) or The Fix, a Canadian comedy film
 "The Fix" (Heroes), a 2007 episode of the NBC TV series
 "The Fix" (House), a 2011 episode of the TV show House
 "The Fix" (Person of Interest), a 2011 episode of the TV series Person of Interest
 The Fix (1997 film), a British TV film about the 1964 betting scandal in English association football
 The Fix (2006 TV series), a celebrity entertainment news show on LivingTV from 2006 to 2009
 The Fix (2008 TV series), a home improvement show on HGTV that began in 2008
 The Fix (2018 TV series), an American Netflix comedy panel show hosted by Jimmy Carr
 The Fix (2019 TV series), an American TV series on ABC

See also 
 
 
 The Fixx, a British rock band
 Fixx (disambiguation)
 Fix (disambiguation)
 Fixing (disambiguation)
 The Fix Is In (disambiguation)
Match fixing